200LR may refer to:
Boeing 777-200LR, aircraft variant
Bombardier CRJ-200LR, aircraft variant